Mitrella is a genus of plants in the family Annonaceae.

Species
Genus Mitrella contains the following species:
 Mitrella aberrans
 Mitrella beccarii
 Mitrella dielsii J.Sinclair
 Mitrella kentii
 Mitrella ledermannii
 Mitrella mesnyi, rumdul, national flower of Cambodia 
 Mitrella schlechteri
 Mitrella silvatica

References

Annonaceae genera
Annonaceae
Taxa named by Friedrich Anton Wilhelm Miquel